Elections to Lambeth London Borough Council were held in May 1968.  The whole council was up for election. Turnout was 29.9%. This election had aldermen as well as councillors. Labour and the Conservatives both got 5 aldermen. Labour lost control of the Council which was under the control of the Conservatives until the next election.

Election result

|}

Ward results

Angell

Bishop's

Clapham Park

Clapham Town

Ferndale

Knight's Hill

Larkhall

Leigham

Oval

Prince's

St Leonard's

Stockwell

Streatham South

Streatham Wells

Thornton

Thurlow Park

Town Hall

Tulse Hill

Vassall

References

1968
1968 London Borough council elections
20th century in the London Borough of Lambeth